The 1992 World Cup took place 5–8 November 1992 at the Real Club La Moraleja in Madrid, Spain. It was the 38th World Cup event. The tournament was a 72-hole stroke play team event. Each team consisted of two players from a country. The combined score of each team determined the team results. The United States team of Fred Couples and Davis Love won by one stroke over the defending champions, Swedish team of Anders Forsbrand and Per-Ulrik Johansson. The individual competition was won by Brett Ogle of Australia after a playoff with Ian Woosnam of Wales.

Teams

Scores
Team

International Trophy

Ogle won at the first sudden death playoff hole.

Source:

References

World Cup (men's golf)
Golf tournaments in Spain
Sports competitions in Madrid
World Cup
World Cup
World Cup